Douglas Woodruff Hillman (February 15, 1922 – February 1, 2007) was a United States district judge of the United States District Court for the Western District of Michigan.

Education and career

Born in Grand Rapids, Michigan, Hillman was a lieutenant in the United States Army from 1942 to 1945. He received an Artium Baccalaureus degree from the University of Michigan in 1946, and a Bachelor of Laws from the University of Michigan Law School in 1948. He was then in private practice in Grand Rapids until 1979.

Federal judicial service

On July 12, 1979, Hillman was nominated by President Jimmy Carter to a new seat on the United States District Court for the Western District of Michigan created by 92 Stat. 1629. He was confirmed by the United States Senate on September 25, 1979, and received his commission the following day. He served as Chief Judge from 1986 to 1991, assuming senior status on February 15, 1991. Hillman served in that capacity until his retirement from the bench on October 1, 2002.

Death

Hillman died on February 1, 2007, in Muskegon, Michigan.

References

Sources
 

1922 births
2007 deaths
Judges of the United States District Court for the Western District of Michigan
United States district court judges appointed by Jimmy Carter
20th-century American judges
United States Army officers
People from Grand Rapids, Michigan
University of Michigan Law School alumni
United States Army personnel of World War II